Colonel Sir Walter Coote Hedley  (12 December 1865 – 27 December 1937) was a British Army officer who began his career in the Royal Engineers and later moved into military intelligence. He was also a gifted amateur sportsman who played first-class cricket for several County Championship sides and competed to a high level in rackets and golf.

Hedley was commissioned into the Royal Engineers in 1884. He became a surveyor in the 1890s and was attached to the Ordnance Survey. This work was interrupted by service in South Africa throughout the Second Boer War, and from 1906 to 1908 by his appointment as an advisor to the Survey of India. In 1911 he was appointed to command MO4, also known as the Geographical Section of the General Staff. During the First World War this organisation was responsible for producing all the maps required by British Empire forces around the world, and in particular mapping the ever-changing trench system on the Western Front. Following the end of the war, he retired from the army in 1920. He was also a Fellow of the Royal Geographical Society and served on the society's council.

Hedley's first-class cricket career began in 1888 with the Gentlemen of England and Kent County Cricket Club. The majority of his county matches were for Somerset County Cricket Club whom he first represented in 1886 in non-first-class games. His first County Championship games for them were in 1892, and he had a regular place in the side from June of that year. Hedley was also a useful rackets player—reaching the final of the amateur championships, held at the Queen's Club, in 1890. In later life he turned to golf, playing off a scratch handicap.

Early life
Hedley was born at Monkton Heathfield near Taunton in Somerset on 12 December 1865. His father, Robert, had served as a captain in the British Army and was a Poor Law Inspector at the time of Hedley's birth. His mother Catherine's maiden name was Coote which he adopted as his usual forename later in life. He was educated at Marlborough College, winning a Modern school scholarship in his first term and was a college prefect at school.

Military career
On leaving school, Hedley entered the Royal Military Academy, Woolwich in March 1883. He was commissioned into the Royal Engineers (RE) as a lieutenant on 9 December 1884, serving initially at the School of Military Engineering at Chatham in Kent before being posted to Shorncliffe with 30 Field Company. He served in Gibraltar between 1890 and 1895 as adjutant of 6 Fortress Company and was promoted captain on 17 January 1894, taking charge of 20 Fortress Company. A report in The Times in 1890, on the final of the rackets amateur championship at Queen's Club already refers to him as "Captain W. C. Hedley" and a history of 20 Survey Company RE published by the Royal Engineers Museum lists him as captain and officer commanding from 1893. In October 1899 he briefly moved to 19 Survey Company. From 1895 he was attached to the Ordnance Survey.

Boer war
The outbreak of the Second Boer War in 1899 took Hedley to South Africa with 17 Field Company. One of the biggest problems facing the British was the lack of suitable maps, so his surveying experience was in demand. He arrived in South Africa in November 1899, he was present at the Relief of Ladysmith, and was Mentioned in Despatches in a despatch dated 30 March 1900, though this was not gazetted until February 1901. The same Gazette carried a further Mention in a despatch dated 9 November 1900. He had been hospitalised earlier in 1900, and was discharged to return to duty in the week ending 18 May 1900. He received a third Mention in September 1901 for service up to April 1901. On 9 July 1901 he left Port Natal on the transport City of Cambridge which was due to arrive at Southampton on 3 August. His obituary in The Times records that he served in the Boer War until 1902, so he may have returned at a later date. In September 1901 it was gazetted that he had received brevet promotion to major for his South African service on 29 November 1900; substantive promotion to that rank came on 18 January 1902. He also received the Queen's South Africa Medal, with six clasps, for his service during the Boer War.

Survey of India
Hedley returned to 19 Company once the war was over, and remained with them until 1903, and he continued in surveying duties with the Ordnance Survey until 1906. He was then appointed as an advisor to the Survey of India in order to modernise map production methods, following efforts by the previous Viceroy of India, George Curzon, 1st Marquess Curzon of Kedleston, and to reform the Survey. Although Hedley faced some resistance to the proposals he made, he was ultimately successful in achieving reform and the Geodetic & Research Branch of the Survey of India still holds in its archives, Notes on the organization, methods and process of the photo-litho office, Calcutta by Major W.C Hedley. He returned to the United Kingdom, and the Ordnance Survey, in 1908, now concentrating on new colour printing techniques. He was promoted lieutenant-colonel on 27 May 1910.

General Staff and First World War
Hedley was appointed a General Staff Officer, Grade 1 at the War Office on 20 September 1911, and took command of the Geographical Section General Staff, known as MO4. The MO prefix stood for "Military Operations" and in 1916 would be changed to "Military Intelligence". Hedley succeeded Charles Close who had been appointed Director General of the Ordnance Survey. The duties of the department were to provide to the British Army maps of all areas of the world—other than the United Kingdom, for which the Ordnance Survey was responsible, and India, which was the responsibility of the India Office, via the Survey of India. Its remit also extended to advising government departments on geographical matters, particular relating to international boundaries.

In preparation for a possible war in Europe, Hedley directed that maps of France and Flanders be produced and stock-piled and that survey work should be carried out in strategically important locations such as Palestine and the Balkans. A mobile map printing section was also established prior to the break out of the First World War, Hedley drawing on his experiences providing maps in South Africa where the ability to produce maps locally had proved vital. He was promoted colonel in December 1913 and remained the technical advisor and manager for MI4 at the War Office throughout the war and he was influential in encouraging the development of sound ranging to survey enemy artillery positions.

Hedley was appointed Companion of the Order of the Bath (CB) in 1915, Commander of the Order of St Michael and St George (CMG) in 1917 and Knight Commander of the Order of the British Empire in 1919. He received the Legion d'Honneur, Ordre de Léopold and Officier of the Ordre de la Couronne as a result of his war service and retired in December 1920, having reached the upper age limit for service.

Cricket career

Hedley played cricket whilst at Woolwich and for the Royal Engineers Cricket Club. He first played for Somerset County Cricket Club in 1886 before the side had first-class status before making his first-class cricket debut for the Gentlemen of England against Cambridge University in 1888. After playing a second match for the Gentlemen against Oxford University, Hedley made his top-level county debut later in the same season for Kent County Cricket Club against Gloucestershire at Blackheath. Hedley represented Kent in two further matches during 1888. After he took 14 Middlesex wickets at Lord's doubts were expressed about his delivery. With Lord Harris, who captained Kent and was a key force within cricket, "striving to stamp out unfair bowling", Hedley's action was assessed by an independent observer in his next county match. As a result, he did not play again for Kent.

He played for I Zingari against the Gentlemen of England three years running from 1888 as part of the Scarborough Festival and for Marylebone Cricket Club (MCC) before becoming a regular in the Somerset side in 1892. Hedley played 84 first-class matches for Somerset from 1892 to 1904, with his final first-class match for the county coming against Hampshire. He scored 2,395 runs at a batting average of 18.14, with two centuries and a high score of 102 against Yorkshire in 1892 and took 254 wickets at an average of 20.77 runs, including 14 five wicket hauls, three ten wicket hauls and best figures of eight for 18 against Yorkshire in 1895. His service in South Africa during the Second Boer War meant that he did not play at all for the county between the end of the 1899 season and the start of the 1903 season. His bowling action was again the subject of discussion in December 1900, when the county captains met to discuss unfair bowling. As a result, Hedley was one of eight cricketers banned from bowling in county cricket in the 1901 season.

In 1902 Hedley played for Devon in a three Minor Counties Championship matches and was awarded a Devon county cap. In 1905 Hedley, then working at Southampton for the Ordnance Survey, joined Hampshire, playing three times for the county during the season before serving in India from 1906.

Family 
Hedley married Anna Susan Fellowes in 1894 at Gibraltar Cathedral. Her father, James Fellowes, was a Colonel in the Royal Engineers who had worked at the Ordnance Survey and played for Kent County Cricket Club in the 1870s. The couple had three daughters: Rosalind who married Henry Frank Heywood, Kathleen and Christian Elizabeth Ann who married Cecil De Sauzmerez, of Sausmarez Manor in Guernsey.

Later life 
After retiring in 1920, Hedley was a Fellow of the Royal Geographical Society. He served on the society's council. He remained involved in cricket, and in 1926 wrote a letter to the editor of The Times, suggesting that a change be made to the leg before wicket law in order to prevent high-scoring matches, an opinion he reiterated in another letter to that paper in 1928. He died in December 1937 at Sunningdale in Berkshire aged 72.

References

External links
 

1865 births
1937 deaths
People from Taunton Deane (district)
People from Somerset
English cricketers
Gentlemen cricketers
Kent cricketers
Marylebone Cricket Club cricketers
Somerset cricketers
Devon cricketers
Hampshire cricketers
Royal Engineers officers
British Army personnel of the Second Boer War
Knights Commander of the Order of the British Empire
Companions of the Order of the Bath
Companions of the Order of St Michael and St George
I Zingari cricketers
Gentlemen of England cricketers
A. J. Webbe's XI cricketers